Phoebodus is an extinct genus of phoebodontiform elasmobranch, known from over a dozen species found worldwide spanning the middle to late Devonian. Most species are only known from their isolated tricuspid teeth, but one species, Phoebodus saidselachus from the Late Devonian of Morocco, is known from a complete skeleton, estimated to have been 1.2 metres in total length in life, which shows that it had a slender body superficially similar to that of the living frilled shark. The teeth of Phoebodus and frilled sharks are also morphologically similar, and are designed for grasping prey. Phoebodus probably consumed small prey items that were capable of being swallowed whole.

Species 
After Ivanov, 2021

 Phoebodus sophiae St. John & Worthen, 1875 (type) Australia, Iran, Mauritania, Poland, Spain, Portugal, United States (Indiana, Iowa, New York), Russia (Siberia) Middle Devonian (Givetian)
 Phoebodus fastigatus Ginter & Ivanov, 1992 Australia, Mauritania, Morocco, Russia (Urals), Poland, Spain, United States (New York, Iowa, Utah, Indiana) Middle-Late Devonian (Givetian-upper Frasnian)
 Phoebodus curvatus Ivanov, 2021 Russia (Urals), Poland, Australia, Middle-Late Devonian (upper Givetian-upper Frasnian)
 Phoebodus latus Ginter & Ivanov, 1995, Australia, Russia (Urals, Siberia), Poland, Iran, Middle-Late Devonian (latest Givetian-upper Frasnian)
 Phoebodus bifurcatus Ginter & Ivanov, 1992 Australia, China, Mauritania, Iran, Poland, Czechia, Belgium, United States (Utah) Russia (Urals) Late Devonian (upper Frasnian)
 Phoebodus typicus Ginter & Ivanov, 1995 Australia, Morocco, Iran, Russia (Urals, Siberia) Late Devonian (lower-mid Famennian) forms labelled P. cf. typicus occur in the middle Famennian of Belarus and Armenia, and the upper Famennian of Siberia
 Phoebodus rayi Ginter & Turner, 1999 Australia, Canada, Iran, Late Devonian (lower-mid Famennian) forms labelled P. cf. typicus occur in Iran and Lithuania, ranging into the early late Fammenian
 Phoebodus turnerae Ginter & Ivanov, 1992  Algeria, Armenia, Belarus, Belgium, Iran, Poland, Morocco  United States (Alaska), Late Devonian (Famennian)
 Phoebodus gothicus Ginter, 1990, Russia (Urals), Iran, Armenia, Algeria, Morocco, Germany, France, Poland, United States (Ohio, Utah, Iowa) south China, Late Devonian (Famennian)
 Phoebodus depressus Ginter, Hairapetian & Klug, 2002 Algeria, Late Devonian (lower-mid Famennian) P. cf. depressus is known from Iran
 Phoebodus saidselachus Frey et al. 2019 Morocco, Late Devonian (early-mid Famennian) 
 Phoebodus limpidus Ginter, 1990 Italy, south China, Russia (Urals, North Caucasus), Morocco, Poland, France, Germany,  United States (Nevada, Wyoming, Utah) Late Devonian (mid-upper Famennian) 
 Phoebodus politus Newberry, 1889 United States (Ohio) Late Devonian (upper Famennian)
Supposed species in this genus from the Triassic, like "Phoebodus" brodiei, and "Phoebodus" keuperinus are now placed in the genus Keuperodus in the family Jalodontidae.

References 

Devonian sharks